Mike Quinn (born 1964) is an English puppeteer, animator, actor, director, producer, voice-over artist, puppet builder, composer and mentor. He is also known as Mike Quinby, Michael E. Quinn, and Michael Quinn.

Early life and career
Quinn was born in Kent, England, and grew up in Enfield, Middlesex. He began puppeteering at age eight.

In 1977, Mike regularly visited the set of The Muppet Show with his homemade puppets, eventually meeting Jim Henson. Through his visits, he learned more about puppeteering and received encouragement from Jim Henson and his co-workers.

After leaving school in 1980, Quinn joined The Jim Henson Company and worked on the 1981 film The Great Muppet Caper puppeteering in crowd scenes and acting as a double for various main Muppet characters. Quinn later designed and built the Podlings for The Dark Crystal, where he also performed the Skeksis Slave Master SkekNa (who was voiced by David Buck).

During the filming of Return of the Jedi, Quinn (and David Barclay and David Greenaway) were assistant puppeteers to Frank Oz in his performance of Yoda. He also performed the role of Nien Nunb in Return Of the Jedi. Between the late 1980s and early 1990s, Quinn joined with fellow puppeteer David Barclay, creating Ultimate Animates, a production company specializing in new building and performing techniques for internal and external puppet productions.

Quinn joined George Lucas's Industrial Light and Magic as an animator, first working on Jurassic Park III and then Star Wars: Episode II – Attack of the Clones.

He reprised his role as Nien Nunb in Star Wars: The Force Awakens, a role that he reprised again in Star Wars: The Last Jedi and Star Wars: The Rise of Skywalker, and performed for the Disney theme park ride Star Wars: Rise of the Resistance.

In 2018, Quinn provided the voice of the Stan Laurel-based character Agnes Packard in the Cartoon Network series, Mighty Magiswords opposing Ken Mitchroney voicing her Oliver Hardy-based husband Mr. Pachydermus in the episode "Pachydermus Packard and the Camp of Fantasy".

Quinn appeared as a guest on The George Lucas Talk Show during their May the AR Be LI$$ You Arli$$ Marathon fundraiser.

Personal life

From 1989 to 2004, Quinn was married to fellow puppeteer Karen Prell.

Filmography

Film

Television

Event

Crew
 Dreamchild - Puppeteer
 Jurassic Park III - Animator
 Little Shop of Horrors - Puppeteer
 Star Wars: Episode II – Attack of the Clones - Animator
 Toy Story 2 - Animator
 Who Framed Roger Rabbit - Puppeteer (UK)

References

External links
 The Official Mike Quinn website

 Mike Quinn's mentoring and training site

British puppeteers
Living people
1964 births
People from Kent